Christian Dumont (born 2 February 1956) is a Belgian racing cyclist. He rode in the 1979 Tour de France.

References

External links
 

1956 births
Living people
Belgian male cyclists
Place of birth missing (living people)